Seven ships of the United Kingdom's Royal Navy have been called HMS Pallas. See Pallas (disambiguation) for various  figures called "Pallas" in Greek mythology.

 The first  was a 36-gun fifth rate launched at Deptford in 1757 and run aground in 1783.
 The second  was a 32-gun fifth rate launched at Woolwich Dockyard in 1793 and wrecked in 1798 on Mount Batten Point, near Plymouth.
 The third Pallas was a 38-gun fifth rate launched at Woolwich Dockyard in 1780 as HMS Minerva but renamed HMS Pallas when she was converted to a troopship in 1798. She was broken up in 1803.
 The fourth  was another 32-gun fifth rate launched at Plymouth in 1804 and wrecked in 1810 at the Firth of Forth.
 The fifth  was a 36-gun fifth rate launched at Portsmouth in 1816, and converted to a coal hulk in 1836. She was sold in 1862.
 The sixth  was an armoured corvette launched at Woolwich Dockyard in 1865, and sold in 1886.
 The seventh  was a  second class cruiser launched at Portsmouth in 1890, and sold in 1906.

References 
 

Royal Navy ship names